Marie-Eve Gahié (born 27 November 1996) is a French judoka. She is the 2017 European bronze medalist and the 2019 World champion in the 70 kg division.

On 12 November 2022 she won a gold medal at the 2022 European Mixed Team Judo Championships as part of team France.

References

External links

 
 
 

1994 births
Living people
French female judoka
Sportspeople from Paris
World judo champions
Judoka at the 2015 European Games
Judoka at the 2019 European Games
European Games gold medalists for France
European Games bronze medalists for France
European Games medalists in judo
21st-century French women